Madison Township is one of the ten townships of Clark County, Ohio, United States. The 2010 census reported 2,543 people living in the township, 850 of whom lived in the unincorporated portions of the township.

Geography
Located in the southeastern corner of the county, it borders the following townships:
Harmony Township - north
Paint Township, Madison County - east
Stokes Township, Madison County - southeast
Ross Township, Greene County - south
Cedarville Township, Greene County - southwest
Green Township - west
Springfield Township - northwest corner

The village of South Charleston is located in central Madison Township.

Name and history
Madison Township is named after Madison County, Ohio.

It is one of twenty Madison Townships statewide.

Government
The township is governed by a three-member board of trustees, who are elected in November of odd-numbered years to a four-year term beginning on the following January 1. Two are elected in the year after the presidential election and one is elected in the year before it. There is also an elected township fiscal officer, who serves a four-year term beginning on April 1 of the year after the election, which is held in November of the year before the presidential election. Vacancies in the fiscal officership or on the board of trustees are filled by the remaining trustees.

References

External links
County website

Townships in Clark County, Ohio
Townships in Ohio